Riann Steele is an American/English actress.

Biography
After studying at Arts Educational Schools, London, she appeared in various Royal Shakespeare Company productions, including A Midsummer Night's Dream, Love's Labours Lost and Hamlet (including its subsequent BBC television film adaptation in 2009) alongside David Tennant. From 2009 to 2010, she played Nurse Lauren Minster in Holby City. Her first feature film role was opposite Aidan Gillen in 2010's Treacle Jr.. In 2012, she starred in the film Sket as Shaks, the girlfriend of a violent gang leader portrayed by Ashley Walters, and in Doctor Who (series 7) as Queen Nefertiti. She has also appeared as Cleo, a therapist, in the Channel 4/Netflix comedy series Lovesick and also appeared as Sydney Halliday in four episodes of NCIS: New Orleans Season 4.

In 2021, Steele played the role of Finola Jones in the NBC drama Debris, whose pilot was written by J. H. Wyman.

Select filmography

References

External links

"Riann Steele // Shaks" in "Sket Press Pack". Revolver Entertainment. Retrieved on 30 August 2012.

1987 births
Black British actresses
English film actresses
English people of Grenadian descent
English stage actresses
Living people
Actors from London
Royal Shakespeare Company members